Laya Jose, better known by her screen name Sreelaya, is an Indian actress acting mainly in Malayalam films and television serials.

Personal life

Laya was born to Jose and cine actress Lissy Jose at Kannur. She has a younger sister Shruthi Lakshmi, also an actress. Sreelaya married Nivin Chacko in 2017, but later got divorced. She then married Robin Cherian in 2021. The couple have a daughter.

Filmography

Film

Television

References

Living people
Actresses in Malayalam television
Actresses in Malayalam cinema
Indian film actresses
Indian television actresses
21st-century Indian actresses
Year of birth missing (living people)